Walk shorts are a men's garment that were popular in New Zealand in the 1960s and 1970s as summer wear for white-collar workers. Walk shorts typically end above the knee and were traditionally worn with knee-high socks and leather shoes or sandals.

The shorts are thought to have had their origins with the baggy khaki drill shorts worn by New Zealand soldiers serving in the Middle East in World War II. In the 1950s, the New Zealand Public Service Association union petitioned the State Services Commission to permit workers to wear shorts. Eventually the Commission permitted staff to wear shorts in "white, grey or fawn", which was later relaxed to allow colour and print fashions of the time.

The walk short is no longer commonly worn in New Zealand but is considered an iconic item of Kiwiana.

See also
Stubbies (brand)

References

External links
"New Zealand Walk Shorts" (1990): news item looking at the history and decline of walk shorts
Walkshort (1987): a short film by performance group The Front Lawn

New Zealand fashion
Trousers and shorts